The Mutton Mountains are a mountain range in Wasco County, Oregon.

References 

Mountain ranges of Oregon
Landforms of Wasco County, Oregon